This is a list of earthquakes in 2003. Only earthquakes of magnitude 6 or above are included, unless they result in damage and/or casualties, or are notable for some other reason.  All dates are listed according to UTC (Coordinated Universal Time) time.

Compared to other years

Overall

By death toll

By magnitude

By month

January

One person was killed.
At least 29 people were killed, 300 were injured and 10,000 were made homeless. 2,005 houses were destroyed and 6,615 were damaged.
One person was killed.

February

 The Vosges department was struck by a magnitude 5,4 quake that occurred on February 22 at Saint-Dié-des-Vosges.
Tremors were felt in Kashgar.
Five people were killed.

March

Four people were killed.
One person was killed.

April

About 200 houses were destroyed and landslides occurred in Yaka Bagh.

May

Tremors were felt in much of eastern Turkey.
At least 2,266 people were killed, 10,000 were injured, 26,000 housing units were damaged or destroyed and 160,000 were made homeless.
One person was killed.
Nine people were killed.

June

One person was killed.

July

One person was killed.
Several people were injured in Darreh Shor.
Two people were killed.

August

Minor damage was caused in the Orcadas Base on Laurie Island. 
At least fifty people were injured, some buildings and infrastructure were damaged and landslides were reported in Lefkada.
Four people were killed.

September

Ten people were killed.
One indirect fatality was reported.
Three people were killed.

October

Three people were killed.
Nine people were killed.

November

One person was killed.
Four people were killed.
One person was killed.

December

Slight damage was caused in Bremo Bluff and Kents Store. 
Two people were killed.
Two people were killed.
A 2,000-year-old UNESCO world heritage site, the Arg-é Bam, was nearly completely destroyed by the earthquake.

References

2003
 
2003